WEZJ may refer to:

 WEZJ-FM, a radio station (104.3 FM) licensed to Williamsburg, Kentucky, United States
 WCWC, a radio station (1440 AM) licensed to Williamsburg, Kentucky, United States, which held the call sign WEZJ until September 2007